Blair Ross (born April 29, 1960) is an American actress.

Biography 
Ross grew up in New Jersey. She attended Vassar College where she majored in art history. After college, Ross lived in Nashville for two years before moving to New York City.

Career 
She has toured as part of a production of Rodgers and Hammerstein's Cinderella.

She has also guest starred in the television series Law & Order: Special Victims Unit, Crafts & Burn, and Entrepreneur along with voice work in the animated television series Spy Groove and in the 2006 video game Bully from Rockstar Games as the art and photography teacher Ms. Philips.

Ross' performance of Dorothy Brock in 42nd Street was called "a zesty performance" by the Star Tribune. The Boston Herald wrote that Ross played Brock as a "peroxided diva with a throaty belt and a haughty comic style." The Los Angeles Times reported that Ross loved playing the part of Dorothy Brock and said that Ross was "looking every bit the sultry vamp" in the show.

In the performance of 2009's Being Audrey, Variety noticed her in the ensemble cast and wrote that she "does a nifty impersonation of Kay Thompson in Funny Face." The New York Times wrote that Ross was "noxiously nasty" in her role as Auntie in Side Show. The Los Angeles Times wrote that Ross "oozes pure avarice as the stepmother, known only as 'Madame,'" in Cinderella. The Washington Post writes that as 'Madame,' she does "the gargoyle thing very well."

In theatre she has performed in New York City at the Ford Center for the Performing Arts, the Marquis Theatre, and the St James's Theatre in musicals such as 42nd Street, Jekyll & Hyde, and Side Show.

Filmography

Theatre

Film

Television

Video games

References

External links
 
 

1956 births
Living people
20th-century American actresses
21st-century American actresses
American stage actresses
American television actresses
American video game actresses
American voice actresses
Actresses from New Jersey
People from Ridgewood, New Jersey
Vassar College alumni
People from Nashville, Tennessee
Actresses from New York City